Dullabcherra ( also known as Durllavcherra ) a township located in Karimganj district in the Indian state of Assam. It is 375 kilometres south of the state capital Guwahati and 57 kilometres south of the district headquarters Karimganj.

Etymology
The name "Dullabcherra" originated meaning from the Singla River word Dullab (meaning "rare") and cherra (meaning "riverbank").

Connectivity
Dullabcherra is connected by road and railways to the rest of the country.

Education
There’s a wide range of private schools in Dullabcherra, including Education Department Govt of Assam schools.

References

   Village and town directory, Census of India 2011.                  
  Dullabcherra, India 
  The last MG section of Northeast converted into BG 
  Entire NE converted into BG line: NFR 
  Strengthening railway infrastructure and boosting connectivity in North East 

Karimganj district